Vladimír Kinder  (born 9 March 1969) is a retired Slovak professional footballer who last played as a left-back for FC Petržalka akadémia.

Kinder played for Middlesbrough in England between 1997 and 1999. He helped them reach three domestic cup finals as well as win promotion to the Premier League.

He earned 1 cap for Representation of Czechs and Slovaks on 16 June 1993 against the Faroe Islands in a World Cup qualifier. Kinder then earned 38 caps for Slovakia, scoring one goal in a 4-2 friendly win over Croatia on 20 April 1994.

Honours
Slovan Bratislava
Czechoslovak First League (1): 1991–92
Slovak Super Liga (3): 1993–94, 1994–95, 1995–96 
Slovak Super Cup (3): 1993, 1994, 1996
FC Middlesbrough
Football League Cup Runners-up (2): 1997, 1998
FA Cup Runners-up (1): 1997
First Division 2nd place 1998 (Promoted)

Individual
Slovak Footballer of the Year (1): 1994
Slovak top eleven (6): 1993, 1994, 1995, 1996, 2001, 2002

References

External links
 
 

1969 births
Living people
Slovak footballers
Slovakia international footballers
Czechoslovak footballers
Czechoslovakia international footballers
Middlesbrough F.C. players
Slovak Super Liga players
Premier League players
ŠK Slovan Bratislava players
FC Petržalka players
Czech First League players
FK Drnovice players
Slovak expatriate sportspeople in England
Expatriate footballers in England
Expatriate footballers in Austria
Expatriate footballers in the Czech Republic
Footballers from Bratislava
Dual internationalists (football)
Slovak expatriate footballers
Slovak expatriate sportspeople in Austria
Slovak expatriate sportspeople in the Czech Republic
Association football defenders
FA Cup Final players